Fikre Wondafrash (born February 27, 1973) is an Ethiopian retired middle-distance runner who specialized in the 1500 meters. He competed for Ethiopia at the 1992 World Junior Championships in Athletics.

Running career

Youth
Although born in Ethiopia, Wondafrash spent a part of his upbringing in Belgrade since his mother worked as an embassy cook there. At one point he had citizenship in Yugoslavia, as he set the country's national boys' junior record for the indoor 1500 meters on February 11, 1992, running 3:48.57 in Budapest for Belgrade club AK Crvena Zvezda. On July 15, 1992, he ran a personal best time of 3:44.29 in the 1500 meters. Later that summer, he represented Ethiopia at the 1992 World Junior Championships in Athletics, placing second to last in heat 2 of the men's 1500 meters.

Collegiate
He was subsequently contacted by Brigham Young University track coach Willard Hirschi, who recruited him to BYU when Yugoslavia was breaking up. On March 30, 1996, he placed second in the men's 800 meters at the Cal Poly meet in San Luis Obispo with a time of 1:52.78. On March 22, 1997, he finished in 13th place in the men's 5000 meters at the Stanford Invitational in a time of 14:32.74. In February 1998, he provisionally qualified for the preliminary rounds of the 1998 NCAA DI Indoor Championships when he ran 4:10.16 for the mile at the Mountain State Games in Pocatello, Idaho. On May 23, 1998, he placed seventh in the men's 1500 meters at the WAC Championships in 3:49.53.

References

Expatriate sportspeople in Yugoslavia
Ethiopian expatriates in Yugoslavia
Ethiopian male middle-distance runners
Ethiopian middle-distance runners
BYU Cougars men's track and field athletes
1973 births
Living people
Ethiopian expatriate sportspeople in the United States